Latvia competed at the 2016 Winter Youth Olympics in Lillehammer, Norway from 12 to 21 February 2016.

Medalists

Medalists in mixed NOCs events

Alpine skiing

Boys

Girls

Biathlon

Boys

Girls

Mixed

Cross-country skiing

Boys

Girls

Figure skating

Singles

Mixed NOC team trophy

Luge

Individual sleds

Mixed team relay

Short track speed skating

Boys

Mixed team relay

Qualification Legend: FA=Final A (medal); FB=Final B (non-medal); FC=Final C (non-medal); FD=Final D (non-medal); SA/B=Semifinals A/B; SC/D=Semifinals C/D; ADV=Advanced to Next Round; PEN=Penalized

Skeleton

See also
Latvia at the 2016 Summer Olympics

References

2016 in Latvian sport
Nations at the 2016 Winter Youth Olympics
Latvia at the Youth Olympics